Her Greatest Love is a 1917 American silent drama film directed by J. Gordon Edwards, starring Theda Bara, and based on the 1880 novel Moths by Ouida. This film is now considered to be lost.

Cast
 Theda Bara as Hazel
 Marie Curtis as Lady Dolly
 Walter Law as Prince Zuoroff
 Glen White as Lord Jura
 Harry Hilliard as Lucies Coresze
 Callie Torres as Jeanne De Sonnaz
 Alice Gale as Nurse
 Grace Saum as Maid

See also
List of lost films
1937 Fox vault fire

References

External links

1917 films
1917 drama films
Fox Film films
Silent American drama films
American silent feature films
American black-and-white films
Films based on British novels
Films based on works by Ouida
Films directed by J. Gordon Edwards
Lost American films
1917 lost films
Lost drama films
1910s American films